Choose My Life-U is the fifth studio album by South Korean girl group S.E.S., released through SM Entertainment on February 15, 2002. The record spawned two singles—"U" and "Just A Feeling (Remix Version)". The album experienced success on the charts in South Korea, where it was the number-one album of February 2002 and sold over 400,000 copies by the end of the year.

Background 
Choose My Life-U marked a transformation into a more mature image for the group. Musically, the lead single "U" contains a mix of rock music, Eurodance, and Latin elements. Its music video features the members taking on various roles including Shoo as a casino dealer, Eugene as a designer, and Bada as a camera director.

Commercial performance 
Choose My Life-U recorded over 300,000 pre-orders prior to its release. On the album charts in South Korea, the album was the number-one best-selling record of February 2002 with sales of nearly 282,000 copies, and became the group's fourth consecutive monthly number-one album. It was the 11th best-selling album of 2002 with over 406,000 copies sold.

Track listing

Charts

Monthly charts

Year-end charts

Sales

Accolades

References

External links 
  S.E.S.' Official Site
  SM Entertainment's Official Site

2002 albums
S.E.S. (group) albums
SM Entertainment albums